Kenneth Murray or Ken Murray may refer to:

Kenneth Murray (American football) (born 1998), American football linebacker
Kenneth Murray (archaeologist) (1903–1972), English archaeologist
Ken Murray (basketball player) (1928–2008), American basketball player
Kenneth Murray (biologist) (1930–2013), English molecular biologist
Ken Murray (entertainer) (1903–1988), American comedian
Ken Murray (footballer) (1928–1993), English footballer
Ken Murray (ice hockey) (born 1948), Canadian ice hockey player
Ken Murray (physician), retired assistant professor of the University of Southern California
Ken Murray (prison officer) (1931–2007), British prison officer and reformer
Ken Murray (basketball coach), Canadian basketball coach
Kenny Murray (rugby union), Scottish rugby coach

See also
K. Gordon Murray (1922–1979), American producer